Springfeld is an unincorporated community in Saskatchewan.

Unincorporated communities in Saskatchewan